Jung Il-hoon is a South Korean rapper, songwriter, record producer, and actor. He was a member of the South Korean boy group BtoB under Cube Entertainment.

BtoB Korean albums/singles

BtoB Japanese albums/singles

Other works by BtoB

Solo work

Other artists

References 

J
J
BtoB (band)